Presidential elections were held in Chile on 25 October 1938. The result was a narrow victory for Pedro Aguirre Cerda of the Radical Party, who received 50.5% of the vote.

Electoral system
The election was held using the absolute majority system, under which a candidate had to receive over 50% of the popular vote to be elected. If no candidate received over 50% of the vote, both houses of the National Congress would come together to vote on the two candidates that received the most votes.

Results

References

Presidential elections in Chile
1938 in Chile
Chile
October 1938 events